Arthrosaura testigensis is a species of lizard in the family Gymnophthalmidae. It is endemic to Venezuelan grasslands.

References

Arthrosaura
Reptiles described in 1999
Reptiles of Venezuela
Endemic fauna of Venezuela
Taxa named by Stefan Jan Filip Gorzula
Taxa named by Josefa Celsa Señaris